Can of Pork is a compilation album of various punk rock artists. It was released as two 12-inch vinyl records or one CD in April 1992 by Lookout Records (LK 44). The vinyl version has a booklet of lyrics and photography and the CD version has information on contacting the bands and a detailed description of the compilation's production.

Background, recording and production
In August 1990, Lookout Records' owner and co-founder, Larry Livermore, and Chris Appelgren, founder of the Puddle fanzine, decided to make a compilation album of various artists. Appelgren contacted groups such as The Offspring, Cringer and Jawbreaker in October 1990, asking them if they wanted to record a song for a compilation album, all of whom declined the offer. In December, Livermore met Pat Hynes, a U.C. student, artist and the founder and publisher of the fanzine 2+2=5, and hired him to work for Lookout and asked him to be involved with the production of Can of Pork. They then contacted bands such as The Wynona Riders, Fifteen and The Mr. T Experience in February 1991 and asked them to record songs for the upcoming compilation, all of whom accepted. A deadline was set for April, which was changed a number of times for 11 months.

Livermore, Hynes and Appelgren came up with working titles for the compilation such as The Thing That Ate David (a reference to the previous Lookout compilation The Thing That Ate Floyd (1989)), Lookout Avenue and This Is Why We Are the Smart Punx, all of which they decided they were not satisfied with. In June, they found out that David Hayes, the owner of the contemporary punk label Very Small Records, was to release a double compilation that year titled Very Small World. Because of this, they debated canceling the project, but ultimately decided to continue. From December 1991 to February 1992, Livermore was in England and left the production of the compilation to Hynes and Appelgren. The same month, Hynes and Appelgren contacted the bands they had decided on and went to record the compilation with Andy Ernst and Kevin Army at Art of Ears Studios in San Francisco. After the recording process was finished, they settled on the title Can of Pork and Hynes began drawing the cover art. Can of Pork was mastered by John Golden at K-Disc in Hollywood.

Release and reception

After a year and a half of production, Can of Pork was released on two 12-inch records or one CD in April 1992 by Lookout Records (LK 44). The vinyl version has a booklet with lyrics and photography, while the CD version has only information on contacting the bands and a detailed description of Can of Porks production. Allmusic rates the compilation 2 and a half out of 5 stars.

Track listing

PersonnelThe Lookouts Larry Livermore - lead vocals, rhythm guitar
 Kain Kong - Bass guitar, backing vocals
 Tré Cool - drums, backing vocals
 Billie Joe Armstrong - lead guitar, backing vocalsLagwagon Joey Cape - vocals
 Chris Flippin - guitar
 Shawn Dewey - guitar
 Jesse Buglione - bass guitar
 Derrick Plourde - drumsBlatz Jesse Luscious - lead vocals
 Robert Eggplant - guitar, backing vocals
 Anna Joy - vocals
 Annie Lalania - vocals
 Marshall Stax - bass guitar
 Joey Perales - drumsFifteen Jeff Ott - lead vocals, guitar
 Jack Curran - bass guitar
 Mark Moreno - drumsPinhead Gunpowder Aaron Cometbus - drums
 Mike Kirsch - lead vocals, guitar
 Bill Schneider - bass guitar, backing vocals
 Billie Joe Armstrong - guitar, backing vocalsDownfall Tim Armstrong - lead vocals
 Matt Freeman - bass guitar, backing vocals
 Dave Mello - drums
 Pat Mello - guitar, backing vocals
 Jason Hammon - guitarThe Wynona Riders Ron "Skip" Greer - lead vocals
 Eric Matson - guitar, backing vocals
 Jack Cheeze - bass guitar
 Rico Martinez - drumsThe Mr. T Experience'
 Dr. Frank - lead vocals, guitar
 Jon Von Zelowitz - guitar, backing vocals
 Aaron Rubin - bass guitar
 Alex Laipeneiks - drums

Production
 Andy Ernst and Kevin Army - producers, engineers, mixing
 Larry Livermore, Pat Hynes and Chris Applecore - executive producers
 John Golden - mastering
 Pat Hynes - cover art
 Chris Applecore - artwork
 Herriman and Wordburger - booklet artwork

See also
 List of punk compilation albums
 1992 in music

Notes

<li id="notea">^* The only song recorded at Dancing Dog Studios was "Benicia by the Bay" by Pinhead Gunpowder.

<li id="noteb">^^* "Noble End" by Lagwagon was the only song on Can of Pork produced by Fat Mike and the only one recorded at Westbeach Recorders.

References

1992 compilation albums
Punk rock compilation albums
Lookout! Records compilation albums